Events from the year 1609 in Ireland.

Incumbent
Monarch: James I

Events
 Plantation of Ulster
Protestant English and Presbyterian Scots settlers are imported directly by undertakers with the sanction of King James VI and I taking over forfeited estates of rebel leaders.
(July) The King submits Motives and Reasons to induce the City of London to undertake the Plantation in the North of Ireland to the City of London.
 John Taylor is granted 1,500 acres (6 km2) of arable land in Ballyhaise, County Cavan.
 June 29 – Richard Wingfield is granted the Powerscourt Estate in County Wicklow for his part in suppressing Cahir O'Doherty's rebellion (1608).
 Arthur Chichester, Lord Deputy of Ireland, has 1,300 former Gaelic soldiers deported from Ulster to serve in the Swedish Army.
 Kilkenny is granted a royal charter by James I.
 James I issues letters patent granting the Church of St. Colman in Dromore the title and status of The Cathedral Church of Christ the Redeemer.

Births
Randal MacDonnell, 1st Marquess of Antrim, Roman Catholic landowner in Ireland and Scotland and political intriguer (d. 1683)
Possible date – William Tirry, priest and Catholic martyr (d. 1654)

References

 
1600s in Ireland
Ireland
Years of the 17th century in Ireland